Keep Your Head Up may refer to:

 "Keep Your Head Up" (Andy Grammer song), 2011
 "Keep Your Head Up" (Ben Howard song), 2011
 "Keep Your Head Up" (Girls Can't Catch song), 2009
 "Keep Your Head Up", a song by Cults from their 2013 album Static
 "Keep Ya Head Up", a 1993 song by Tupac Shakur